Colour Photo is a 2020 Indian Telugu-language period romantic drama film directed by debutante Sandeep Raj. Produced by Amrutha Productions and Loukya Entertainment, the film stars Suhas in his first lead role, along with Chandini Chowdary, and Sunil. The music was composed by Kaala Bhairava, marking his second film as composer after Mathu Vadalara. The film is set in Machilipatnam, Andhra Pradesh in the mid-1990s and is said to be the story of a "below-average guy".

The film was premiered on aha on 23 October 2020. The films stars many debutants who previously worked in few short films including the director of the film Sandeep Raj. The film was shot completely in Machilipatnam, Vijayawada and the surrounding areas in Andhra Pradesh. At the 68th National Film Awards, it won the Best Feature Film in Telugu.

Plot 
The film begins with Deepthi receiving the news of her father's death. She and her husband Chandu reach their village and meet their family. Ramaraju, Deepthi's brother and the local sub-inspector, tries to talk to her, but she shuts him down and goes to her ex Jayakrishna's house in his jeep. Her friend Padmaja accompanies her, and they spot a couple arguing. Deepthi finds their issues very similar to her past with Jayakrishna, and narrates her story.

Jayakrishna, the son of a milkman, studies in the same college as Deepthi's. He once saw her rehearsing for a performance as a goddess, and fell in love with her. However, unlike Deepthi, he is dark skinned and from a poor economic background. Hence, he never expresses his feelings towards her. A year later, a few seniors rag Jayakrishna by tricking him into going to Deepthi's rehearsal and then beat him up for "teasing girls". Deepthi and her friends go to the principal and explain what truly happened, and Jayakrishna gets out of trouble. However, he starts avoiding them, as he does not want anyone to think badly. Deepthi confronts and proposes to Jayakrishna. On Jayakrishna's request, she accepts to keep their relationship a secret. With her encouragement, he beats up the seniors who beat him up and earns confidence and courage.

Unexpectedly, Padmaja and Jayakrishna's friend Bala Yesu "Balu" get to know about their relationship. They, too, accept to keep this a secret. Things go well for the couple until a fest, where the college principal denies Jayakrishna an opportunity to speak on the stage because of his skin tone. Jayakrishna feels insulted and gives a speech on the stage, criticising colour discrimination in front of the chief guest - a foreigner who does not understand Telugu and considers it a speech favouring engineering.

The principal, along with the seniors that have a grudge against him, decides to take revenge. On Deepthi's birthday, when Jayakrishna meets her in an empty class, the seniors lock the room and allege that the couple were having an amorous relationship. Ramaraju is angered and sends her away from the village. Jayakrishna is beaten up subsequently. However, as Deepthi arrives to collect her hall ticket, Jayakrishna shows up and leaves with her as Ramaraju is stuck in the college with their friends' help.

The couple feels encouraged and leaves happily. Then, Padmaja and Deepthi recollect the actual happenings. Jayakrishna was beaten up, humiliated, and his certificates were burnt by Ramaraju, thus ensuring that he gets no job in the future. He also kills Lakshmi, a calf Jayakrishna has raised very dearly, naming it after his deceased mother and cooks the calf into beef biryani and forces Jayakrishna to eat it, pretending it is mutton biryani. 
When Jayakrishna retorted, Ramaraju broke his leg, leaving him lame.

Jayakrishna met Deepthi when she arrived to receive her hall ticket, and they decide to commit suicide by consuming poison. Jayakrishna dies on the spot, but Deepthi was rescued by Ramaraju. Balu was left devastated and lost his sanity. The film ends with Deepthi learning that no photo of Jayakrishna exists in the village, and she drawing his portrait, calling it the 'Colour Photo'.

Cast 

 Suhas as Jayakrishna alias Kittu, Kannaya 
 Chandini Chowdary as Deepthi Varma alias Deepu
 Sunil as Inspector Rama Raju, Deepthi's elder brother 
 Harsha Chemudu as Bala Yesu alias Balu, Jayakrishna's friend
 Divya Sripada as Padmaja alias Paddu, Deepthi's friend
 Vidya Maharshi as Rama Raju's wife
 Sai Krishna Enreddy as College Principal
 Kancharapalem Raju as Jayakrishna's father 
 Aadarsh Balakrishna as Chandu, Deepthi's husband
 R. K. Mallidi as Dharma
 Sri Krishna Paani as Paani
 Sneha Madhuri Sharma as Roja, Deepthi's friend
 Arun Kumar Pulavarthi as Murali
 Chandini Rao as Deepika
 PSN Murthy as Watchman
 Pandu Pulapaka as Peon
 Jaya Naidu as Deepthi and Rama Raju's mother
 Veerabhadra Rao as Deepthi and Rama Raju's father

Production

Development 
Director Sandeep Raj already directed and acted in few short films. He is known for his performance in short films. In 2019, he decided to direct a small-budgeted film with his short films team. Most of the actors in the film made their debut were previously YouTubers and those who did few short films. In an interview, Raj said that he wants to direct the films which have versatile story-telling.

Cast and crew 

Sandeep Raj decided to feature the YouTubers he worked with. Chandini Chowdary already made her debut as a lead actress in Tollywood, also acted in few short films in early days. Suhas, the hero of the film is a good friend of Raj, also started his career from short films. Suhas also been as a comedian in many big Tollywood films. The director thus decided to cast these actors in leading roles. Actor Sunil was roped into the film as the main antagonist. Most of the other actors were also acted in few short films. In an interview Sandeep Raj revealed that Chandini Chowdary was not the first choice for the lead actress role, it is Niharika Konidela who was the first considered for the role. In an interview to Film Companion South, Suhas told that, "My hundred short films prepared me for feature films".

With the success of the music album of Mathu Vadalara, Sandeep chose Kaala Bhairava for the film's soundtrack and background score. The story is written by Sai Rajesh from his own incidents he faced. Debutant Venkat Shakamuri handled the cinematography of the film. Kranthi Priyam was chosen as the art director who previously worked in Agent Sai Srinivasa Athreya (2019).

Filming 
Principal photography of the film started on 8 January 2020 in Hyderabad. The film was completely shot in Machilipatnam, Vijayawada and the surrounding parts. The story of the film also revolves around these places.

Post-production 
By the end of the March 2020, shooting of the film is almost done. While the post production was completed by mid-April.

Themes and influences 
The film's central theme revolves around the colourism. It is based on the real-life incidents that happened the life of the film's story writer Sai Rajesh. A reviewer of TeluguCinema stated that the film is all about 'Colour'. He further added that Colour Photo deals with colourism, and boasts good dialogue writing. Despite tad slow-paced and dull initial portions, the latter half of the film has touching moments.

Another reviewer of GreatAndhra noted that "The genre of love stories has dealt with issues including casteism, and honor killings. What other new topics would a writer come up with for a conflict point for a love story? Here, Sai Rajesh has touched upon this issue of colourism. While this issue has not been dealt with much in our films, the proceedings have little novelty."

Sanat Kumar Malik of FastNewsFeeds wrote that "’It’s 1999 and people still discriminate based on skin colour and caste,’ rues Jayakrishna in Colour Photo. Oh well, in 2020, we still need the hashtag ‘Black Lives Matter’ and skin lightening creams continue to have many takers."

Music 

The soundtrack and background score were scored by Kaala Bhairava and lyrics by Kittu Vissapragada and Sai Kiran. The audio was released on Aditya Music.

The first single ''Tharagathi Gadhi's'' lyrical version was released on Aditya Music on 27 August 2020. This single received good appreciation and is the most successful song among the album. Second single "Arere Akasam" was released on 21 September 2020. The third single ''Ekaantham's'' lyrical version was out on 7 October 2020.

Reception 
The Hans India stated that ''Kaala Bhairava's music is a major asset for the movie. The songs are pleasant and the background score is impressive too.'' 123Telugu wrote in its review that ''One of the biggest plus points of the film is undoubtedly Kaala Bhairava, the music director. His songs are superb and have a haunting effect on you. His background music is also impressive.''

A reviewer wrote that "Kaala Bhairava is here to stay. Very often, we see music directors taking small films lightly. He has done an excellent job both with the songs and the background score."

Release 
Although the makers of the film initially wanted to the release the film in theaters, COVID-19 pandemic made them to opt for alternative sources. Finally, the producers of the film Sai Rajesh and Benny made a deal with OTT platform, Aha to release the film digitally. The producers and Allu Aravind announced the decision of releasing the film on Aha on 23 October 2020 on the eve of Vijayadasami festival.

Reception 
The Times of India critic Thadhagath Pathi gave 3.5/5 stars and wrote that "Colour Photo is a heart-wrenching love story that stays with you." Pathi praised the performances of the lead cast, in addition to music and other technical aspects. Sangeetha Devi Dundoo of The Hindu stated that Colour Photo deserves a pat on the pack for going against the norms in Telugu cinema. Eenadu wrote that the film is "an impressive love story in parts." While appreciating the director for picking up a storyline based on colourism, the reviewer opined that he couldn't translate it well into the screenplay. The review also stated that the lead actors have performed well in their given roles. A reviewer from Sakshi praised the storyline, performances and the music but criticized the slow-paced screenplay.

Jahnavi Reddy of The News Minute wrote that the film ''The intersections of biases around skin colour, caste and race are extremely complex, and the film doesn't exactly do a perfect job addressing them". Baradwaj Rangan of Film Companion South stated that ''Colour Photo is one of the better products of this [direct-to-streaming] era.'' 

Murali Krishna CH of Cinema Express wrote that the dialogues and performance while pointing out there were some scenes.'' The Hans India gave 2.5/5 stars and stated that ''Sai Rajesh Neelam is the story writer of the movie. He penned an interesting love story with a routine conflict. The film goes well with a section of audiences because of too many predictable things that it offers.'' NTV wrote about the film that "Colour Photo [..] is a watchable love story with a touching climax", adding that the film didn't hanker go after low-hanging fruits, rather it showed courage of conviction and delivered some unconventional content. "

Accolades

Notes

References

External links 
 
 Colour Photo  on Aha

2020 films
Films set in Andhra Pradesh
Indian historical romance films
2020s Telugu-language films
Films shot in Andhra Pradesh
Films shot in Vijayawada
Indian romantic drama films
Indian romantic action films
2020 romantic drama films
2020 directorial debut films
Films not released in theaters due to the COVID-19 pandemic
Films scored by Kaala Bhairava
Films about social issues in India
Films about social issues
Films about racism
Films set in India
Films shot in India
Social realism in film
Aha (streaming service) original films
Best Telugu Feature Film National Film Award winners